Nizhny Novgorod Dobrolyubov State Linguistic University is an institution of higher education in the city of Nizhny Novgorod, Russia, and it is one of two linguistic universities in Russia. The institution was established in the year 1937 as the Gorky Pedagogical Institute of Foreign Languages.

History 
In 1917 the municipal language courses were established in Nizhny Novgorod. Based on those courses, the Gorky Pedagogical Institute of Foreign Languages was founded in 1937.  The first buildings of the Institute (modern buildings No. 1 and No. 2) were built in 1948 on the site of the destroyed Troitskaya Verkhneposadskaya Church on the Old Hay (Staraya) Square (1844).  Before the construction of these two buildings, the Institute was located in the building of the former 3rd female gymnasium in Chernoprudsky Lane (Zhukovsky Library now).  Today, 4 buildings of the university occupy the entire space of the former Starosnaya Square and the underground space below it.

Initially, the Institute trained teachers of English, German, French, and Spanish for secondary schools and had, respectively, three faculties: English, German, and Romance languages.  Linguists were also trained at the correspondence department.

In 1964, the Faculty of Translation of Western European languages was established.

In the 1990s new faculties and departments were created, in 1994 the institute was given the status of a Linguistic University.

Gallery

See also 

 List of modern universities in Europe (1801–1945)
 List of institutions of higher education in Russia

References

External links
 Official website of the Linguistic University
 Facebook page
 VK page (Russian)

Academic language institutions
Buildings and structures in Nizhny Novgorod
Universities in Volga Region
Educational institutions established in 1937
1937 establishments in Russia